The 2019 Honda Indy Grand Prix of Alabama Presented by AmFirst was the 3rd round of the 2019 IndyCar season. The race was held on April 7, 2019, in Birmingham, Alabama. Takuma Sato won the race from the pole position scoring his fourth career IndyCar victory.

Results

Qualifying

Race 

Notes:
 Points include 1 point for leading at least 1 lap during a race, an additional 2 points for leading the most race laps, and 1 point for Pole Position.

Championship standings after the race

Drivers' Championship standings

Manufacturer standings

 Note: Only the top five positions are included.

References 

Grand Prix of Alabama
Honda Indy Grand Prix of Alabama
Honda Indy Grand Prix of Alabama
Honda Indy Grand Prix of Alabama